Yerköprü Waterfall is a waterfall in Mersin Province, southern Turkey. It is a registered natural monument.

Location and access
The waterfall is located to the north of Kuskan village of Gülnar ilçe (district) in Mersin Province, But it is accessible from Mut ilçe. It is situated to the southeast of Gezende Dam.

In early March 2013, the road leading to the waterfall was blocked by rocks due to a landslide. After almost two years, construction works began for access to the waterfall on the other bank of the creek. It can be reached by a wooden staircase down from a bridge over the creek.

The site is a popular tourist attraction . Admission is collected for visitors and vehicles.

Waterfall
The waterfall is on the Ermenek Creek, a tributary of the Göksu River. It was formed in a deep canyon by a narrow spring emerged in faults of Cretaceous-period limestone formation rocks, which are about 110 million years old. It is fed by an underground water tunnel of about  length, and  width, a cave with stalactites and a rich vegetation. Water from the Gezende Dam join the spring water in the cave.

Gallery

References

Waterfalls of Turkey
Landforms of Mersin Province
Gülnar District
Nature parks in Turkey
Tourist attractions in Mersin Province
Protected areas established in 2001
2001 establishments in Turkey